The simple station Gratamira is part of the TransMilenio mass-transit system of Bogotá, Colombia, which opened in the year 2000.

Location

The station is located in northwestern Bogotá, specifically on Avenida Suba with Calle 132A.

It serves the Altos de Chozica, Ciudad Jardín Norte, and Escuela de Carabineros neighborhoods.

History

In 2006, phase two of the TransMilenio system was completed, including the Avenida Suba line, on which this station is located.

The station is named Gratamira as it is located a few meters from the Gratamira housing complex.

Station services

Main line service

Feeder routes

This station does not have connections to feeder routes.

Inter-city service

This station does not have inter-city service.

External links
TransMilenio

See also
Bogotá
TransMilenio
List of TransMilenio Stations

TransMilenio